The 2017–18 Idaho State Bengals men's basketball team represented Idaho State University during the 2017–18 NCAA Division I men's basketball season. The Bengals, led by sixth-year head coach Bill Evans, played their home games at Holt Arena and Reed Gym in Pocatello, Idaho as members of the Big Sky Conference. They finished the season 14–16, 9–9 in Big Sky play to finish in a tie for sixth place. They lost in the first round of the Big Sky tournament to Southern Utah.

Previous season
The Bengals finished the 2016–17 season 5–26, 3–15 in Big Sky play to finish in a tie for 11th place. As the No. 10 seed in the Big Sky tournament, they lost in the first round to Sacramento State.

Offseason

Departures

Incoming transfers

2017 recruiting class
Idaho State did not have any incoming players in the 2017 recruiting class.

Roster

Schedule and results

|-
!colspan=9 style=| Non-conference regular season

|-
!colspan=9 style=| Big Sky regular season

|-
!colspan=9 style=| Big Sky tournament

References

Idaho State Bengals men's basketball seasons
Idaho State
IIdaho
IIdaho